Active voice is a grammatical voice common in many of the world's languages. It is the unmarked voice for clauses featuring a transitive verb in nominative–accusative languages, including English and most other Indo-European languages. A verb in such languages is usually in the active voice when the subject of the verb performs the action named.

Active voice is used in a clause whose subject expresses the main verb's agent. That is, the subject does the verb's designated action. A clause whose agent is marked as grammatical subject is called an active clause. In contrast, a clause in which the subject has the role of patient or theme is named a passive clause, and its verb is expressed in passive voice. Many languages have both an active and a passive voice and this allows for greater flexibility in sentence construction, as either the semantic agent or patient may take the subject syntactic role.

In a clause including an impersonal verb, the verb is active in form, but no agent is specified.

Examples
In the following examples, the active and passive voice are illustrated with pairs of sentences using the same transitive verb.

See also

Antipassive voice
Mediopassive voice
 E-Prime, a version of the English language that excludes forms of the verb to be

References

Grammatical voices